Augusta Mall is a two level super-regional shopping mall in Augusta, Georgia, United States. It is one of the largest malls in the state of Georgia, and it is the largest mall in the Augusta metropolitan area. The anchor stores are Dick's Sporting Goods, JCPenney, Dillard's, Macy's, and Barnes & Noble. There is 1 vacant anchor store that was once Sears.

History
Augusta Mall opened on August 3, 1978, one week after the now-defunct Regency Mall opened.

Augusta Mall had about 90 retail spaces when it first opened, anchored by two department stores: Rich's and Davison's. Many of the mall's design features were borrowed from other successful malls developed by The Rouse Company. The space frame ceiling is a replica of The Mall in Columbia, Governor's Square Mall, Tampa Bay Center and Hulen Mall while the center fountain and elevator was taken from Beachwood Place, which opened the same month as Augusta.

Since its opening, the mall has undergone 5 major expansions and several smaller renovations. The first of these began in 1987, when the mall added a 132,000-square-foot expansion for a new location of J. C. Penney.

In 1990, the mall underwent its second expansion, when Sears joined as the fourth anchor, in a 157,000-square-foot store. The $32 million renovation project also updated the interior of the mall and expanded the number of retail spaces from about 100 to more than 130.

In October 1992, Vice President of the United States Dan Quayle held a rally at the mall during the final stretch of the campaign before the 1992 United States presidential election. Over 5,000 supporters showed up, well above expectation for 1,000 attendants.

By 1998, when the third expansion was announced, Augusta Mall had become the region’s prime shopping area. J. B. White closed its store at Regency Mall and relocated to Augusta Mall to become its fifth anchor store, now Dillard's. Traffic congestion became a problem on Wrightsboro Road and Interstate 520 - the main freeway connecting the mall. The city funded a $231,000 project for expanded lanes as well as road improvements and new exit ramps to the mall.

In 2002, Regency Mall was officially closed to the public, and boarded up.

Also in 2002, the Augusta Mall infrastructure was upgraded, including: storm drain maintenance, a new parking lot, and other interior work. Macy’s closed during this time, and its lower level was converted into a furniture store.

In 2006, a fourth expansion, “The Augusta Promenade”, a  lifestyle center addition to the mall was announced. Construction of the development started in the summer of 2006, with the grand opening on November 8, 2007.

In 2007, a man drove his car into the mall.

In January 2013, Abercrombie & Fitch closed its location at the mall.

In July 2014, a thief stole $2,000 worth of panties from the Victoria's Secret store at the mall.

In January 2016, Vans, Torrid, and rue21 announced plans to open locations at the mall.

In January 2017, Buca di Beppo, which had opened in February 2012, closed its location at the mall.

In April 2017, several men robbed the Apple Inc. store at the mall.

In April 2018, Williams Sonoma closed its location at the mall. Also that month, the mall began to be powered by a 435-kilowatt rooftop solar panel system.

In September 2018, QC Nails Salon announced plans to open a 4,500 square foot location at the mall. 

On February 8, 2020, it was announced that Sears would be closing as part of a plan to close 39 stores nationwide. The store closed in April 2020.

On October 3, 2020, after an altercation, a gun was pulled out and two people were shot. One victim was transported to a nearby hospital where he later died from his wounds. The other victim was shot in the leg and she is expected to make a full recovery.

See also

List of shopping malls in the United States

Photos

References

https://www.wjbf.com/breaking-news/shooting-at-augusta-mall-confirmed/

External links
Augusta Mall — official website

Shopping malls established in 1978
Shopping malls in Georgia (U.S. state)
Brookfield Properties
Economy of Augusta, Georgia
Buildings and structures in Augusta, Georgia
Tourist attractions in Augusta, Georgia